John Adair (1757–1840) was a U.S. soldier, statesman and governor of Kentucky.

John Adair may also refer to:

John Adair (surveyor) (1660–1718), Scottish surveyor and mapmaker
John Adair (soldier), (1732–1837), American pioneer and soldier, early settler of the Knoxville, Tennessee area
John A. M. Adair (1864–1938), U.S. Congressman from Indiana
John Adair (anthropologist) (1913–1997), American anthropologist
John George Adair (1823–1885), Scots-Irish businessman and landowner, financier of JA Ranch in the Texas Panhandle
Johnny Adair (born 1963), Northern Irish paramilitary leader
John Adair (author) (born 1934), UK consultant and author on leadership
John Frederick Adair (1852–1913), Irish physicist